Terbuthylazine is a selective herbicide. Chemically, it is a chlorotriazine; compared with atrazine and simazine, it has a tert-butyl group in place of the isopropyl and ethyl groups, respectively.

Referenced

Herbicides
Triazines
Chloroarenes
Tert-butyl compounds